Mike Evelyn (born 13 April 1993) is a Canadian bobsledder who competes in the two-man and four-man events as a brakeman.

Career
Evelyn is a former ice hockey player who switched to bobsleigh during the 2019–20 season.

In January 2022, Evelyn was named to Canada's 2022 Olympic team.

Alongside his success in bobsled, Evelyn received a degree in electrical engineering from Dalhousie University in 2019 and works as a systems engineer.

References

1993 births
Living people
Canadian male bobsledders
Sportspeople from Ottawa
Bobsledders at the 2022 Winter Olympics
Olympic bobsledders of Canada